Buchholz railway station may refer to 
Buchholz (Baden) railway station
Buchholz (Nordheide) railway station
Buchholz (Zauche) railway station